Michael Hemmingsen (born 2 October 1967) is a Danish professional football manager and former player who most recently was the head coach of Danish 1st Division club Fremad Amager.

Career
He was formerly the interim manager at Odense BK after Bruce Rioch left the club in March 2007, and the manager of SønderjyskE, Randers FC, FC Vestsjælland, and Næstved BK. He played the most of his career in OB as well. He is the older brother of former Denmark international Carsten Hemmingsen.

On 28 June 2022, Fremad Amager appointed Hemmingsen as head coach, effective from 17 July 2022, replacing Peter Løvenkrands. He was sacked in December 2022 with the club placed in 9th place.

References

External links

Career stats at Danmarks Radio

1967 births
Living people
Danish men's footballers
Association football defenders
Boldklubben 1909 players
Odense Boldklub players
Danish football managers
Odense Boldklub managers
SønderjyskE Fodbold managers
FC Vestsjælland managers
Fremad Amager managers
Danish Superliga managers
Danish 1st Division managers